Anametis is a genus of broad-nosed weevils in the beetle family Curculionidae. There are at least two described species in Anametis.

Species
These two species belong to the genus Anametis:
 Anametis granulata (Say, 1831) i c g b
 Anametis subfusca Fall, 1907 i c g b
Data sources: i = ITIS, c = Catalogue of Life, g = GBIF, b = Bugguide.net

References

Further reading

 
 
 
 

Entiminae
Articles created by Qbugbot